Associação Limeirense de Basquete, also commonly known as Basquete Limeira, and known as Winner/Kabum Limeira for sponsorship reasons, is a Brazilian professional basketball team that is based in Limeira, São Paulo, Brazil.

History
Winner Limeira was founded in 2001, with the intention of rescuing club basketball in Limeira, and competing for both state and national titles. In its first year, Limeira won the second division of the State Championship and the Regional Games. Over the following eight years, Limeira won the Regional Games, and also won its first Brazilian championship, which was named the Nossa Liga de Basquete, in 2006.

In the club's first NBB season, was the 2009 NBB season. In that season, with a core group of players consisting of Nezinho dos Santos, Betinho Duarte, Shamell Stallworth, Guilherme Teichmann, and Bruno Fiorotto, they finished in fifth place in the league, after being defeated by Joinville. Limeira did not participate in the second season of the NBB.

In the following two seasons, Limeira had similar campaigns, finishing in ninth place. In the 2014 FIBA South American League, Limeira advanced from the preliminary round, with two wins and one loss, but only won one out of three games in the semifinals.

Roster

Honors and titles

National
 Brazilian Championship 
 Champions (1): 2006

Regional
 São Paulo State Championship 
 Champions (2): 2008, 2010
 Runners-up (2): 2004, 2014

Other Tournaments
 Regional Games 
 Winners (11): 2001, 2002, 2003, 2004, 2005, 2006, 2007, 2008, 2009, 2011, 2012
 EPTV Cup 
 Winners (1): 2008

Noted players

 Duda Machado
 Rafa Mineiro
 Deryk Evandro Ramos

Head coaches
 Demétrius Conrado Ferraciú

References

External links
Official website 
Latinbasket.com Profile

Basketball teams in Brazil
Basketball teams established in 2001
Limeira
Novo Basquete Brasil
Basketball in São Paulo (state)